Dicrolene is a genus of cusk-eels.

Species
There are currently 15 recognized species in this genus. They are listed below along with their discoverer:
 Dicrolene filamentosa Garman, 1899
 Dicrolene gregoryi Trotter, 1926
 Dicrolene hubrechti M. C. W. Weber, 1913
 Dicrolene introniger Goode & T. H. Bean, 1883 (Digitate cusk-eel)
 Dicrolene kanazawai Grey, 1958
 Dicrolene longimana H. M. Smith & Radcliffe, 1913
 Dicrolene mesogramma Shcherbachev, 1980
 Dicrolene multifilis (Alcock, 1889) (Slender brotula)
 Dicrolene nigra Garman, 1899
 Dicrolene nigricaudis (Alcock, 1891)
 Dicrolene pallidus Hureau & J. G. Nielsen, 1981
 Dicrolene pullata Garman, 1899
 Dicrolene quinquarius (Günther, 1887)
 Dicrolene tristis H. M. Smith & Radcliffe, 1913
 Dicrolene vaillanti (Alcock, 1890)

References

Ophidiidae